The Shaper/Mechanist universe is the setting for a series of science fiction short stories (and the novel Schismatrix) written by the author Bruce Sterling.  The stories combined cover approximately 350 years of future history, for the period ranging from AD 2200–2550.  (Note: All years given are taken from  "A Shaper/Mechanist Chronology" in the book Schismatrix Plus, which includes all the Shaper/Mechanist material.)

The stories deal with a posthuman society spread across the solar system—primarily in fragile orbiting colonies around planetary bodies like the Moon, Jupiter, Saturn and the Sun.  The Earth and its inhabitants have been abandoned by these citizens of the so-called Schismatrix, and no communication is performed or attempted with them.  Humanity has largely polarized into two competing factions:

The Shapers attempt to push the limits by manipulating the human body itself, through genetic modification and highly specialized psychological training.  The Shapers are aristocratic, placing heavy emphasis on "gene-lines"—to be "unplanned" (i.e., born) is considered a serious disadvantage.  Their methods could best be described as "organic".  Shaper society, based around the Military-Academic complex, is described as fascist.

In contrast, the Mechanists have disdain for the Shapers' methods and instead prefer to use cybernetic augmentation, advanced computer software, technical expertise, and drugs to achieve their goals. The "Lobsters" are Mechanists who permanently seal their bodies into life-support shells allowing them to live and work in deep space. Some Mechanists even go as far as to become "wireheads"—individuals with no corporeal body who are simply manifested as computer simulations.  The Mechanist philosophy favors individualism more than the collectivist Shapers. 

This uneasy duality is transformed and complicated by the arrival of the Investors, lizardlike aliens that trade with both factions (who consequently compete for the aliens' favor).

One recurring theme in the Shaper/Mechanist universe is that of the commodification of humanity. Both Shapers and Mechanists often treat individuals as if they were technology—subject to ownership, control, obsolescence, etc. There is a continual tension between people attempting to express their individuality and human feelings, and the political, economic and technological forces that compel them to suppress their humanity.

Works 

The works, listed by original publication date, title, "future timeframe", and a brief summary:

 "Swarm" (1982; set in AD 2248) – Shaper Captain Simon Afriel joins a fellow researcher in an interstellar embassy: an asteroid belt inhabited by colonies of insect-like aliens.  Afriel also briefly appears in "Twenty Evocations" and Schismatrix.  This was also Sterling's first "officially" published short story.
 "Spider Rose" (1982; set in 2283) – An ancient Mechanist from the fringes of the solar system buys something new from the Investors: a pet. Spider Rose herself appears very briefly during happier times in Schismatrix.
 "Cicada Queen" (1983; set in 2354) – A Shaper named Landau comes of age politically inside Czarina-Kluster, a habitat independent of faction where backroom deals and social cliques dominate, and whose stability is becoming increasingly fragile.  Wellspring, a visionary rogue Mechanist and leading proponent of the post-humanist philosophy, is Landau's mentor. Schismatrix later expands on the background of both Wellspring and C-K, which he helped found.
 "Sunken Gardens (1984; set in 2554) – Individuals from various factions compete in a test of terraforming skills in a crater on the Martian surface. This story expands on the influence and power of Terraform Kluster and its leader, the enigmatic Lobster King (who first appears in "Cicada Queen").
 "Twenty Evocations" (1984; originally published as "Life in the Shaper/Mechanist Era: Twenty Evocations"; set around 2220–2400) – An experimental story; fragments from the life of a Shaper named Nikolai Leng.
 Schismatrix (1985 novel; set in 2215–2386). It chronicles the life of a renegade, Shaper-trained diplomat named Abelard Lindsay, as he struggles politically with his former ally Philip Constantine, and with the slow evolution of philosophies and ideologies that occurs in his long lifetime. This work also follows the development of Sterling's future history, making the setting itself nearly a character in the work.

The first five Shaper/Mechanist short stories are collected in the 1989 short story collection Crystal Express, and republished with Schismatrix as Schismatrix Plus (1995) with a new introduction "The Circumsolar Frolics".

Fictional locations by series
Science fiction book series